Tourak is a rural locality (a selo) in Kuyachinsky Selsoviet, Altaysky District, Altai Krai, Russia. The population was 378 as of 2013. There are 7 streets.

Geography 
Tourak is located 77 km southwest of Altayskoye (the district's administrative centre) by road. Kuyacha is the nearest rural locality.

References 

Rural localities in Altaysky District, Altai Krai